Jeffrey "Jeff" Kingston (born June 26, 1957) is an American professor at Temple University in Tokyo and an author. He has written a number of books and writes regularly for The Japan Times and other publications.

Early life and studies
He graduated with a BS in foreign service from Georgetown University in 1979. He then completed an MA in international affairs in 1981 and a PhD in history, both from Columbia University

He is married and his wife's relatives are from Iwate Prefecture.

Academic career
Kingston is the director of Asian Studies at Temple University in Tokyo.

Writing
Kingston has written for The Japan Times since 1988. He had a weekly column called "Counterpoint" until 2017. He also writes for The Asia-Pacific Journal: Japan Focus.

Views

Kingston is a consistent critic of Japanese Prime Minister Shinzō Abe and his moves to amend Article 9 of the Japanese Constitution, which restricts Japan's military and on Abe's historical revisionism about Japanese war crimes.

Bibliography

Books written 
 Japan's quiet transformation: Social change and civil society in the 21st century (2004)
 Contemporary Japan: History, Politics and Social Change Since the 1980s (2010)(2012)
 Japan in transformation 1952–2000 (2010)

Edited volumes 
 Natural Disaster and Nuclear Crisis in Japan: Response and Recover After Japan's 3/11 (2012)
 Contemporary Japanese Politics (4 volumes) (2013)
 Press Freedom in Contemporary Japan (Routledge, 2017)

References

External links
 Temple University – Jeff Kingston
 The Japan Times – Jeff Kingston

1957 births
Living people
Walsh School of Foreign Service alumni
Columbia Graduate School of Arts and Sciences alumni
Foreign educators in Japan
American emigrants to Japan
Japanese-language writers
American expatriates in Japan
American Japanologists
American non-fiction writers
American male non-fiction writers
School of International and Public Affairs, Columbia University alumni